Inertia is the resistance of a physical object to change in its velocity.

Inertia may also refer to:

Science
 Moment of inertia, the resistance to angular acceleration
 Second moment of area, a geometrical property of a body that determines its resistance to bending
 Thermal inertia or effusivity, the resistance of an object or body to temperature change in response to heat input
 Sylvester's law of inertia, a theorem in matrix algebra
 Sleep inertia, a psychological state
 Climate inertia, a slowness of the Earth system to changes in significant factors such as greenhouse gas levels
 Ecological inertia, the ability of a living system to resist external fluctuations

Social science
 Cognitive inertia, resistance to change in an individual's beliefs
 Psychological inertia, a tendency to favor omission over commission due to a lack of incentive to act
 Psychical inertia, a term introduced by Carl Jung
 Social inertia, description of a person's resistance to change in psychology and sociology
 Corporate inertia or unwillingness to change, a diseconomy of scale in microeconomics

Arts and entertainment
 Inertia (film), a 2001 Canadian drama
 Inertia (Marvel Comics), a fictional hero
 Inertia (DC Comics), a fictional antagonist
 "Inertia" (short story), a story by Nancy Kress

Music
 Inertia, an Irish DJ duo, the pairing of John O'Callaghan and Neal Scarborough
 Inertia (The Exies album), an album by The Exies
 Inertia (Derek Sherinian album), an album by Derek Sherinian
 "Inertia", a song by Bruce Dickinson from the album Skunkworks
 "Inertia", a song by The Wonder Stuff from the album Never Loved Elvis
 "Inertia", a 2016 song by 20syl
 “Inertia”, a song by Britpop band Blur, from their debut album Leisure